Quercus deserticola is a Mexican species of oaks in the beech family. It grows in central Mexico in the States of Guanajuato, México, Hidalgo, Jalisco, Querétaro, Oaxaca, Sinaloa, Puebla, and Michoacán.

Description
Quercus deserticola is a shrub or small tree sometimes as much as 7 metres (23 feet) in height, with gray bark. The twigs are yellow-green and densely hairy.

References

External links
 photo of herbarium specimen at Missouri Botanical Garden, collected in Sinaloa in 1940

deserticola
Endemic oaks of Mexico
Flora of the Trans-Mexican Volcanic Belt
Flora of the Sierra Madre del Sur
Flora of the Sierra Madre Oriental
Trees of Guanajuato
Trees of the State of Mexico
Trees of Hidalgo (state)
Trees of Jalisco
Trees of Querétaro
Trees of Oaxaca
Trees of Sinaloa
Trees of Puebla
Trees of Michoacán
Plants described in 1924
Taxa named by William Trelease